Randles is a surname which may refer to:

Elizabeth Randles (1800–1829), Welsh child prodigy harpist and pianist
Jan Randles, Australian Paralympic runner who competed in the 1984 New York/Stoke Mandeville Paralympics
Jenny Randles, British author and former director of investigations with the British UFO Research Association
John Scurrah Randles (1875–1945), British businessman and Conservative politician
Jos Randles (1865–1925), English footballer
Kerri Randles (born 1971), American actress, writer and producer
Paul Randles (1965–2003), American game designer 
Paul Randles (cricketer) (1922–1979), South African cricketer 
Peter Randles (1923–2008), Australian politician
Robert Randles (1888–1916), English footballer
Tom Randles (footballer) (born 1940), former footballer for New Zealand 
Tom Randles (hurler), Irish hurler from the 1950s to the 1980s

See also
Randle, a surname and a given name
Randles, Missouri, an unincorporated community
Randles circuit, an electrical model
Randles Hill, a hill in Kandy, Sri Lanka